Sara Ramirez is a Mexican-American actor. They are known for acting in films, television shows, stage productions as well as voicing roles in video games.

Filmography

Film, video games, and television

Stage productions

Awards and nominations

References

External links
 

Actress filmographies
Lists of awards received by American actor
American filmographies
Mexican filmographies